State Road 345 (SR 345) is a north–south route in the Big Bend area of Florida, running from U.S. Route 27 Alternate (US 27 Alt.) east of Chiefland to County Road 332 (CR 332) southwest of Chiefland. South of CR 332, the road becomes County Road 345 as it runs towards Rosewood.

Major intersections

References

External links

345
345
345